Pure is the ninth album by jazz saxophonist Boney James, released in 2004.

Track listing

Personnel 
 Boney James – keyboards (1, 3-8), programming (1, 5), tenor saxophone (1, 3-6, 8, 9), string arrangements (1), soprano saxophone (2, 7), drum programming (2), horn arrangements (3, 4, 6, 7, 9, 10), keyboard bass (5)
 Phil Davis – keyboards (1)
 Morris Pleasure – acoustic piano (1), keyboards (2), Fender Rhodes (9), clavinet (9)
 Rex Rideout – keyboards (2)
 Greg Smith – keyboards (3), arrangements (3)
 David Torkanowsky – Fender Rhodes (3, 4), acoustic piano (6), Wurlitzer organ (6)
 Joe Sample – acoustic piano (4)
 Darrell Smith – clavinet (4)
 Johnny Britt – keyboards (8)
 Tim Carmon – organ (9)
 Kurt "KC" Clayton – Digital Rhodes piano (10)
 Bobby Lyle – acoustic piano (10)
 Billy Preston – organ (10)
 Matt Richardson – source sounds (10)
 Dean Parks – acoustic guitar (1, 2, 6), electric guitar (1, 6)
 Rohn Lawrence – wah guitar (1), electric guitar (2), guitars (6, 9)
 Paul Jackson Jr. – guitars (3, 7)
 Tony Maiden – guitars (5)
 Erick Walls – guitars (8)
 Marlon McClain – guitars (10)
 Pino Palladino – bass (1), fuzz bass (9)
 Alex Al – bass (2, 4, 7, 8), "funk" bass (9)
 Larry Kimpel – bass (6)
 Ricardo Jordan – hi-hat overdubs (1), drums (6)
 Ahmir "?uestlove" Thompson – drums (2, 4, 9)
 Teddy Campbell – drums (8)
 Ricky Lawson – drums (10)
 Lenny Castro – percussion (1-4, 6, 9)
 Luis Conte – percussion (5, 7, 8, 10)
 Dan Higgins – tenor saxophone (3, 4, 6, 7, 9, 10)
 Bill Reichenbach Jr. – trombone (3, 4, 6, 7, 9, 10)
 Jerry Hey – string arrangements (1, 2), trumpet (3, 4, 6, 7, 9, 10), horn arrangements (3, 4, 6, 7, 9, 10)
 Cecilia Tsan – cello (1, 2)
 Roland Kato – viola (1, 2)
 Ralph Morrison – violin (1, 2)
 Sara Parkins – violin (1, 2)
 Bilal – vocals (2)
 Debi Nova – vocals (5)
 Dwele – vocals (7)
 Lauren Evans – vocals (9)

Production 
 Jeff Aldrich – A&R 
 Boney James – producer, recording 
 Greg Smith – additional producer (3)
 Paul Brown – producer (10)
 Gerald McCauley – producer (10)
 Ray Bardani – recording 
 Russell Elevado – recording 
 Todd Fairall – recording 
 Dave Rideau – recording 
 Rex Rideout – recording 
 Bill Schnee – recording 
 Koji Egawa – Pro Tools consultant
 Aaron Fessel – second engineer 
 Jesse Gorman – second engineer
 Marc McLaughlin – second engineer
 Michael Musmanno – second engineer
 Ryan Petrie – second engineer, additional Pro Tools consultant
 Greg Price – second engineer, additional Pro Tools consultant
 Jason Rankins – second engineer
 Steef Van De Gevel – second engineer, additional Pro Tools consultant
 Antony Zeller – second engineer
 Dragan "DC" Capor – additional Pro Tools consultant
 John Hanes – additional Pro Tools consultant
 Steve Mazur – additional Pro Tools consultant
 Serban Ghenea – mixing 
 Tim Roberts – mix assistant 
 Chris Gehringer – mastering 
 Lexy Shroyer – production coordinator 
 Mick Haggerty – art direction
 James Minchin III – photography 
 Direct Management Group, Inc. – management 

Studios
 Recorded at The Backyard and Westlake Audio (Los Angeles, California); Schnee Studios (North Hollywood, California); KAR Studios (Sherman Oaks, California); Electric Lady Studios, The Hit Factory and Sear Sound (New York City, New York); Studio A Recording (Dearborn Heights, Michigan).
 Mixed at MixStar Studios (Virginia Beach, Virginia).
 Mastered at Sterling Sound (New York City, New York)

References

2004 albums
Boney James albums
Warner Records albums